Wanjiru Mbugua-Karani (born 21 Jun 1974) is a former Kenyan Tennis player now serving as the Secretary-General of Tennis Kenya.

Wanjiru is a member of the Confederation of African Tennis (CAT) Women in Sports Commission Committee, and the International Tennis Federation Gender Equality Committee.

Career
Wanjiru is a former Kenya National Champion, and FED Cup team captain, who first ventured into office in July 2011 after being elected a Council Member following a Kenya Lawn Tennis Association election. 

In 2015 she was elected the Secretary-General of Tennis Kenya for the first time, a position she retained in the next election in mid-2019.

Education
Wanjiru is a Communication graduate from Daystar University. While pursuing her undergrad, she also attained a Level II Tennis coaching badge.  

She holds an Executive Masters in Sport Organizations Management (MEMOS) from Belgium-based Université Catholique de Louvain courtesy of a scholarship from the International Tennis Federation.

References

External links
 Wanjiru Mbugua at ITF
 
 2020-21 CAT Committees
 2020-2021 ITF Committees
 2022-2023 ITF Committees
 Wanjiru Karani Team Kenya Profile

Kenyan female tennis players
Kenyan sports executives and administrators
Living people
1974 births